EPFL (Swiss Federal Institute of Technology in Lausanne; French: Ecole polytechnique fédérale de Lausanne) has had five presidents since the school was created in 1969.

In 1968, Maurice Cosandey, the president of the École polytechnique universitaire de Lausanne (Lausanne University Polytechnic School, or EPUL) came up with the idea of turning that school into a federal institute. This resulted in the creation of EPFL in 1969, with Cosandey as its first president. He has been succeeded in this role by four other people, in the following order: Bernard Vittoz, Jean-Claude Badoux, Patrick Aebischer, and Martin Vetterli (the current president, since 1 January 2017).

Appointment process 
The EPFL president is appointed by the Swiss Federal Council for renewable four-year terms. The process for appointing the presidents of the Swiss federal institutes of technology is not subject to strict rules. Martin Vetterli, the current president, was nominated by the Federal Department of Economic Affairs, Education and Research, which acted on the recommendation of the Board of the Swiss Federal Institutes of Technology (ETH Board).

EPFL presidents

References

Bibliography 
 Histoire de l'École polytechnique de Lausanne : 1953-1978, Presses polytechniques et universitaires romandes, 1999. 
 Michel Pont, Chronique de l'EPFL 1978-2000, Presses polytechniques et universitaires romandes, 2010. 
 

École Polytechnique Fédérale de Lausanne